Hano is a populated place situated in the First Mesa CDP in Navajo County, Arizona, United States, on the Hopi Reservation.

History
The village was settled by the Hopi-Tewa, a band of Tewa people, in the early 17th century on First Mesa.

Name
The village has been known by a plethora of names, including Ha-no-me, Hanoki, Janogualpa, Na-ca-ci-kin, Tanoquevi, Tanus, Te-e-wun-na, and Tewa. In 1915, the Board on Geographic Names officially named it Tegua, before changing their decision in 1989 to the current Hano. Hano is a Hopi term meaning "eastern people".

References

Populated places in Navajo County, Arizona